Wine is an alcoholic drink typically made from fermented grapes. Yeast consumes the sugar in the grapes and converts it to ethanol and carbon dioxide, releasing heat in the process. Different varieties of grapes and strains of yeasts are major factors in different styles of wine. These differences result from the complex interactions between the biochemical development of the grape, the reactions involved in fermentation, the grape's growing environment (terroir), and the wine production process. Many countries enact legal appellations intended to define styles and qualities of wine. These typically restrict the geographical origin and permitted varieties of grapes, as well as other aspects of wine production. Wines can be made by fermentation of other fruit crops such as plum, cherry, pomegranate, blueberry, currant and elderberry.

Wine has been produced for thousands of years. The earliest evidence of wine is from the Caucasus region in today's Georgia (6000 BCE), Persia (5000 BCE),  Italy and Armenia (4000 BCE). New World wine has some connection to alcoholic beverages made by the indigenous peoples of the Americas, but is mainly connected to later Spanish traditions in New Spain. Later, as Old World wine further developed viticulture techniques, Europe would encompass three of the largest wine-producing regions. Today, the five countries with the largest wine producing regions are in Italy, Spain, France, the United States, and China.

Wine has long played an important role in religion. Red wine was associated with blood by the ancient Egyptians and was used by both the Greek cult of Dionysus and the Romans in their Bacchanalia; Judaism also incorporates it in the Kiddush, and Christianity in the Eucharist. Egyptian, Greek, Roman, and Israeli wine cultures are still connected to these ancient roots. Similarly the largest wine regions in Italy, Spain, and France have heritages in connection to sacramental wine, likewise, viticulture traditions in the Southwestern United States started within New Spain as Catholic friars and monks first produced wines in New Mexico and California.

History 

The earliest known traces of wine are from Georgia ( BCE), Iran (Persia) ( BCE), Armenia (c. 4100 BCE), and Sicily ( BCE). Wine reached the Balkans by 4500 BC and was consumed and celebrated in ancient Greece, Thrace and Rome. Throughout history, wine has been consumed for its intoxicating effects.

The earliest archaeological and archaeobotanical evidence for grape wine and viniculture, dating to 6000–5800 BCE was found on the territory of modern Georgia. Both archaeological and genetic evidence suggest that the earliest production of wine elsewhere was relatively later, likely having taken place in the Southern Caucasus (which encompasses Armenia, Georgia and Azerbaijan), or the West Asian region between Eastern Turkey, and northern Iran. The earliest known winery from 4100 BCE is the Areni-1 winery in Armenia.

A 2003 report by archaeologists indicates a possibility that grapes were mixed with rice to produce fermented drinks in ancient China in the early years of the seventh millennium BCE. Pottery jars from the Neolithic site of Jiahu, Henan, contained traces of tartaric acid and other organic compounds commonly found in wine. However, other fruits indigenous to the region, such as hawthorn, cannot be ruled out. If these drinks, which seem to be the precursors of rice wine, included grapes rather than other fruits, they would have been any of the several dozen indigenous wild species in China, rather than Vitis vinifera, which was introduced 6000 years later.

The spread of wine culture westwards was most probably due to the Phoenicians who spread outward from a base of city-states along the Mediterranean coast centered around modern day Lebanon (as well as including small parts of Israel/Palestine and coastal Syria); however, the Nuragic culture in Sardinia already had a custom of consuming wine before the arrival of the Phoenicians. The wines of Byblos were exported to Egypt during the Old Kingdom and then throughout the Mediterranean. Evidence for this includes two Phoenician shipwrecks from 750 BCE, found with their cargoes of wine still intact, which were discovered by Robert Ballard As the first great traders in wine (cherem), the Phoenicians seem to have protected it from oxidation with a layer of olive oil, followed by a seal of pinewood and resin, similar to retsina.

The earliest remains of Apadana Palace in Persepolis dating back to 515 BCE include carvings depicting soldiers from Achaemenid Empire subject nations bringing gifts to the Achaemenid king, among them Armenians bringing their famous wine.

Literary references to wine are abundant in Homer (8th century BCE, but possibly relating earlier compositions), Alkman (7th century BCE), and others. In ancient Egypt, six of 36 wine amphoras were found in the tomb of King Tutankhamun bearing the name "Kha'y", a royal chief vintner. Five of these amphoras were designated as originating from the king's personal estate, with the sixth from the estate of the royal house of Aten. Traces of wine have also been found in central Asian Xinjiang in modern-day China, dating from the second and first millennia BCE.

The first known mention of grape-based wines in India is from the late 4th-century BCE writings of Chanakya, the chief minister of Emperor Chandragupta Maurya. In his writings, Chanakya condemns the use of alcohol while chronicling the emperor and his court's frequent indulgence of a style of wine known as madhu.

The ancient Romans planted vineyards near garrison towns so wine could be produced locally rather than shipped over long distances. Some of these areas are now world-renowned for wine production. The Romans discovered that burning sulfur candles inside empty wine vessels kept them fresh and free from a vinegar smell. In medieval Europe, the Roman Catholic Church supported wine because the clergy required it for the Mass. Monks in France made wine for years, aging it in caves. An old English recipe that survived in various forms until the 19th century calls for refining white wine from bastard—bad or tainted bastardo wine.

Later, the descendants of the sacramental wine were refined for a more palatable taste. This gave rise to modern viticulture in French wine, Italian wine, Spanish wine, and these wine grape traditions were brought into New World wine. For example, Mission grapes were brought by Franciscan monks to New Mexico in 1628 beginning the New Mexico wine heritage, these grapes were also brought to California which started the California wine industry. Thanks to Spanish wine culture, these two regions eventually evolved into the oldest and largest producers, respectively, of wine of the United States. Viking sagas earlier mentioned a fantastic land filled with wild grapes and high-quality wine called precisely Vinland. Prior to the Spanish establishing their American wine grape traditions in California and New Mexico, both France and Britain had unsuccessfully attempted to establish grapevines in Florida and Virginia respectively.

In East Asia, the first modern wine industry was Japanese wine, developed in 1874 after grapevines were brought back from Europe.

Etymology 

The English word "wine" comes from the Proto-Germanic *winam, an early borrowing from the Latin vinum, Georgian ღვინო (ghvee-no), "wine", itself derived from the Proto-Indo-European stem *win-o- (cf. , gini; Ancient Greek:  oinos; Aeolic Greek:  woinos; Hittite: wiyana; Lycian: oino). The earliest attested terms referring to wine are the Mycenaean Greek  me-tu-wo ne-wo (*), meaning "in (the month)" or "(festival) of the new wine", and  wo-no-wa-ti-si, meaning "wine garden", written in Linear B inscriptions. Linear B also includes, inter alia, an ideogram for wine, i.e. .

The ultimate Indo-European origin of the word is the subject of some continued debate. Some scholars have noted the similarities between the words for wine in Indo-European languages (e.g. Armenian gini, Latin vinum, Ancient Greek οἶνος, Russian вино ), Kartvelian (e.g. Georgian ღვინო ), and Semitic (*wayn; Hebrew יין ), pointing to the possibility of a common origin of the word denoting "wine" in these language families. The Georgian word goes back to Proto-Kartvelian *ɣwino-, which is either a borrowing from Proto-Indo-European or the lexeme was specifically borrowed from Proto-Armenian *ɣʷeinyo-, whence Armenian gini. An alternate hypothesis by Fähnrich supposes *ɣwino-, a native Kartvelian word derived from the verbal root *ɣun- ('to bend'). See *ɣwino- for more. All these theories place the origin of the word in the same geographical location, South Caucasus, that has been established based on archeological and biomolecular studies as the origin of viticulture.

Types of wine 
Wine types:
 Red wine, made from blue grapes with skins.
 White wine, made from green grapes or destemmed blue grapes.
 Rosé wine, made from blue grapes, where the skins are sorted from early in the fermentation process or rosé wine can also be made from rosé wine grape varieties.
 Sparkling wine, made from both green and blue grapes. Champagne is made from pinot noir, meunier and chardonnay around Reims.
 Hard wineda, wine with a higher alcohol content than the other types. See also: Fortified wine
 Ice wine, wine with a characteristically sweet taste and low alcohol content.
 Dessert wine, are sweet wines that are typically served with a dessert.

The types have such different properties that in practice they are considered different drinks.

Styles 
Wine is made in many ways from different fruits, with grapes being the most common.

From grapes 
The type of grape used and the amount of skin contact while the juice is being extracted determines the color and general style of the wine. The color has no relation to a wine's sweetness—all may be made sweet or dry.

Red 

Red wine gains its color and flavor (notably, tannins) from the grape skin, by allowing the grapes to soak in the extracted juice. Red wine is made from dark-colored red grape varieties. The actual color of the wine can range from violet, typical of young wines, through red for mature wines, to brown for older red wines. The juice from most red grapes is actually greenish-white; the red color comes from anthocyanins present in the skin of the grape. A notable exception is the family of rare teinturier varieties, which actually have red flesh and produce red juice.

White 

To make white wine, grapes are pressed quickly with the juice immediately drained away from the grape skins. The grapes used are typically white grape varieties, though red grapes may be used if the winemaker is careful not to let the skin stain the wort during the separation of the pulp-juice. For example, pinot noir (a red grape) is commonly used in champagne.

Dry (low sugar) white wine is the most common, derived from the complete fermentation of the juice, however sweet white wines such as Moscato d'Asti are also made.

Rosé 

A rosé wine gains color from red grape skins, but not enough to qualify it as a red wine. It may be the oldest known type of wine, as it is the most straightforward to make with the skin contact method. The color can range from a pale orange to a vivid near-purple, depending on the varietals used and wine-making techniques.

There are three primary ways to produce rosé wine: Skin contact (allowing dark grape skins to stain the wort), saignée (removing juice from the must early in fermentation and continuing fermentation of the juice separately), and blending of a red and white wine (uncommon and discouraged in most wine growing regions). Rosé wines have a wide range of sweetness levels from dry Provençal rosé to sweet White Zinfandels and blushes. Rosé wines are made from a wide variety of grapes all over the world.

Orange 

Sometimes called amber wines, these are wines made with white grapes but with the skins allowed to soak during pressing, similar to red and rosé wine production. They are notably tannic, and usually made dry.

Sparkling

These are effervescent wines, made in any of the above styles (ie, orange, red, rosé, white). They must undergo secondary fermentation to create carbon dioxide, which creates the bubbles.

Two common methods of accomplishing this are the traditional method, used for Cava, Champagne, and more expensive sparkling wines, and the Charmat method, used for Prosecco, Asti, and less expensive wines. A hybrid transfer method is also used, yielding intermediate results, and simple addition of carbon dioxide is used in the cheapest of wines.

Dessert 
This refers to sweet wines that have a high level of sugar remaining after fermentation. There are various ways of increasing the amount of sugar in a wine, yielding products with different strengths and names. Icewine, Port, Sauternes, Tokaji Aszú, Trockenbeerenauslese, and Vin Santo are some examples.

From other fruits and foods

Fruit 

Wines from other fruits, such as apples and berries, are usually named after the fruit from which they are produced, and combined with the word "wine" (for example, apple wine and elderberry wine) and are generically called fruit wine or country wine (similar to French term vin de pays). Other than the grape varieties traditionally used for wine-making, most fruits naturally lack either sufficient fermentable sugars, proper amount of acidity, yeast amounts needed to promote or maintain fermentation, or a combination of these three materials. This is probably one of the main reasons why wine derived from grapes has historically been more prevalent by far than other types, and why specific types of fruit wines have generally been confined to the regions in which the fruits were native or introduced for other reasons.

Honey 

Mead, also called honey wine, is created by fermenting honey with water, sometimes with various fruits, spices, grains, or hops. As long as the primary substance fermented is honey, the drink is considered mead. Mead was produced in ancient history throughout Europe, Africa and Asia, and was known in Europe before grape wine.

Starch 
Other drinks called "wine", such as barley wine and rice wine (e.g. sake, huangjiu and cheongju), are made from starch-based materials and resemble beer more than traditional wine, while ginger wine is fortified with brandy. In these latter cases, the term "wine" refers to the similarity in alcohol content rather than to the production process. The commercial use of the English word "wine" (and its equivalent in other languages) is protected by law in many jurisdictions.

Grape varieties 

Wine is usually made from one or more varieties of the European species Vitis vinifera, such as Pinot noir, Chardonnay, Cabernet Sauvignon, Gamay and Merlot. When one of these varieties is used as the predominant grape (usually defined by law as minimums of 75% to 85%), the result is a "varietal" as opposed to a "blended" wine. Blended wines are not necessarily inferior to varietal wines, rather they are a different style of wine-making.

Wine can also be made from other species of grape or from hybrids, created by the genetic crossing of two species. V. labrusca (of which the Concord grape is a cultivar), V. aestivalis, V. rupestris, V. rotundifolia and V. riparia are native North American grapes usually grown to eat fresh or for grape juice, jam, or jelly, and only occasionally made into wine.

Hybridization is different from grafting. Most of the world's vineyards are planted with European Vitis vinifera vines that have been grafted onto North American species' rootstock, a common practice due to their resistance to phylloxera, a root louse that eventually kills the vine. In the late 19th century, most of Europe's vineyards (excluding some of the driest in the south) were devastated by the infestation, leading to widespread vine deaths and eventual replanting. Grafting is done in every wine-producing region in the world except in Argentina and the Canary Islands – the only places not yet exposed to the insect.

In the context of wine production, terroir is a concept that encompasses the varieties of grapes used, elevation and shape of the vineyard, type and chemistry of soil, climate and seasonal conditions, and the local yeast cultures. The range of possible combinations of these factors can result in great differences among wines, influencing the fermentation, finishing, and aging processes as well. Many wineries use growing and production methods that preserve or accentuate the aroma and taste influences of their unique terroir. However, flavor differences are less desirable for producers of mass-market table wine or other cheaper wines, where consistency takes precedence. Such producers try to minimize differences in sources of grapes through production techniques such as micro-oxygenation, tannin filtration, cross-flow filtration, thin-film evaporation,
and spinning cones.

About 700 grapes go into one bottle of wine, approximately 2.6 pounds.

Classification 

Regulations govern the classification and sale of wine in many regions of the world. European wines tend to be classified by region (e.g. Bordeaux, Rioja and Chianti), while non-European wines are most often classified by grape (e.g. Pinot noir and Merlot). Market recognition of particular regions has recently been leading to their increased prominence on non-European wine labels. Examples of recognized non-European locales include Napa Valley, Santa Clara Valley, Sonoma Valley, Anderson Valley, and Mendocino County in California; Willamette Valley and Rogue Valley in Oregon; Columbia Valley in Washington; Barossa Valley in South Australia; Hunter Valley in New South Wales; Luján de Cuyo in Argentina; Vale dos Vinhedos in Brazil; Hawke's Bay and Marlborough in New Zealand; Central Valley in Chile; and in Canada, the Okanagan Valley of British Columbia, and the Niagara Peninsula and Essex County regions of Ontario are the three largest producers.

Some blended wine names are marketing terms whose use is governed by trademark law rather than by specific wine laws. For example, Meritage is generally a Bordeaux-style blend of Cabernet Sauvignon and Merlot, but may also include Cabernet Franc, Petit Verdot, and Malbec. Commercial use of the term Meritage is allowed only via licensing agreements with the Meritage Association.

European classifications 

France has various appellation systems based on the concept of terroir, with classifications ranging from Vin de Table ("table wine") at the bottom, through Vin de Pays and Appellation d'Origine Vin Délimité de Qualité Supérieure (AOVDQS), up to Appellation d'Origine Contrôlée (AOC) or similar, depending on the region. Portugal has developed a system resembling that of France and, in fact, pioneered this concept in 1756 with a royal charter creating the Demarcated Douro Region and regulating the production and trade of wine. Germany created a similar scheme in 2002, although it has not yet achieved the authority of the other countries' classification systems. Spain, Greece and Italy have classifications based on a dual system of region of origin and product quality.

Beyond Europe 
New World wines—those made outside the traditional wine regions of Europe—are usually classified by grape rather than by terroir or region of origin, although there have been unofficial attempts to classify them by quality.

According to Canadian Food and Drug Regulations, wine in Canada is an alcoholic drink that is produced by the complete or partial alcoholic fermentation of fresh grapes, grape must, products derived solely from fresh grapes, or any combination of them. There are many materials added during the course of the manufacture, such as yeast, concentrated grape juice, dextrose, fructose, glucose or glucose solids, invert sugar, sugar, or aqueous solutions. Calcium sulphate in such quantity that the content of soluble sulphates in the finished wine shall not exceed 0.2 percent weight by volume calculated as potassium sulphate. Calcium carbonate in such quantity that the content of tartaric acid in the finished wine shall not be less than 0.15 percent weight by volume. Also, sulphurous acid, including salts thereof, in such quantity that its content in the finished wine shall not exceed 70 parts per million in the free state, or 350 parts per million in the combined state, calculated as sulphur dioxide. Caramel, amylase and pectinase at a maximum level of use consistent with good manufacturing practice. Brandy, fruit spirit or alcohol derived from the alcoholic fermentation of a food source distilled to not less than 94 percent alcohol by volume. Prior to final filtration may be treated with a strongly acid cation exchange resin in the sodium ion form, or a weakly basic anion exchange resin in the hydroxyl ion form.

Vintages 

In the United States, for a wine to be vintage-dated and labeled with a country of origin or American Viticultural Area (AVA; e.g., Sonoma Valley), 95% of its volume must be from grapes harvested in that year. If a wine is not labeled with a country of origin or AVA the percentage requirement is lowered to 85%.

Vintage wines are generally bottled in a single batch so that each bottle will have a similar taste. Climate's impact on the character of a wine can be significant enough to cause different vintages from the same vineyard to vary dramatically in flavor and quality. Thus, vintage wines are produced to be individually characteristic of the particular vintage and to serve as the flagship wines of the producer. Superior vintages from reputable producers and regions will often command much higher prices than their average ones. Some vintage wines (e.g. Brunello), are only made in better-than-average years.

For consistency, non-vintage wines can be blended from more than one vintage, which helps wine-makers sustain a reliable market image and maintain sales even in bad years. One recent study suggests that for the average wine drinker, the vintage year may not be as significant for perceived quality as had been thought, although wine connoisseurs continue to place great importance on it.

Tasting 

Wine tasting is the sensory examination and evaluation of wine. Wines contain many chemical compounds similar or identical to those in fruits, vegetables, and spices. The sweetness of wine is determined by the amount of residual sugar in the wine after fermentation, relative to the acidity present in the wine. Dry wine, for example, has only a small amount of residual sugar. Some wine labels suggest opening the bottle and letting the wine "breathe" for a couple of hours before serving, while others recommend drinking it immediately. Decanting (the act of pouring a wine into a special container just for breathing) is a controversial subject among wine enthusiasts. In addition to aeration, decanting with a filter allows the removal of bitter sediments that may have formed in the wine. Sediment is more common in older bottles, but aeration may benefit younger wines.

During aeration, a younger wine's exposure to air often "relaxes" the drink, making it smoother and better integrated in aroma, texture, and flavor. Older wines generally fade (lose their character and flavor intensity) with extended aeration. Despite these general rules, breathing does not necessarily benefit all wines. Wine may be tasted as soon as the bottle is opened to determine how long it should be aerated, if at all. When tasting wine, individual flavors may also be detected, due to the complex mix of organic molecules (e.g. esters and terpenes) that grape juice and wine can contain. Experienced tasters can distinguish between flavors characteristic of a specific grape and flavors that result from other factors in wine-making. Typical intentional flavor elements in wine—chocolate, vanilla, or coffee—are those imparted by aging in oak casks rather than the grape itself.

Vertical and horizontal tasting involves a range of vintages within the same grape and vineyard, or the latter in which there is one vintage from multiple vineyards. "Banana" flavors (isoamyl acetate) are the product of yeast metabolism, as are spoilage aromas such as "medicinal" or "Band-Aid" (4-ethylphenol), "spicy" or "smoky" (4-ethylguaiacol), and rotten egg (hydrogen sulfide). Some varieties can also exhibit a mineral flavor due to the presence of water-soluble salts as a result of limestone's presence in the vineyard's soil. Wine aroma comes from volatile compounds released into the air. Vaporization of these compounds can be accelerated by twirling the wine glass or serving at room temperature. Many drinkers prefer to chill red wines that are already highly aromatic, like Chinon and Beaujolais.

The ideal temperature for serving a particular wine is a matter of debate by wine enthusiasts and sommeliers, but some broad guidelines have emerged that will generally enhance the experience of tasting certain common wines. White wine should foster a sense of coolness, achieved by serving at "cellar temperature". Light red wines drunk young should also be brought to the table at this temperature, where they will quickly rise a few degrees. Red wines are generally perceived best when served chambré ("at room temperature"). However, this does not mean the temperature of the dining room—often around —but rather the coolest room in the house and, therefore, always slightly cooler than the dining room itself.

Collecting 

Outstanding vintages from the best vineyards may sell for thousands of dollars per bottle, though the broader term "fine wine" covers those typically retailing in excess of US$30–50. "Investment wines" are considered by some to be Veblen goods: those for which demand increases rather than decreases as their prices rise.
Particular selections such as "Verticals", which span multiple vintages of a specific grape and vineyard, may be highly valued. The most notable was a Château d'Yquem 135-year vertical containing every vintage from 1860 to 2003 sold for $1.5 million.
The most common wines purchased for investment include those from Bordeaux and Burgundy; cult wines from Europe and elsewhere; and vintage port. Characteristics of highly collectible wines include:

 A proven track record of holding well over time
 A drinking-window plateau (i.e., the period for maturity and approachability) that is many years long
 A consensus among experts as to the quality of the wines
 Rigorous production methods at every stage, including grape selection and appropriate barrel aging

Investment in fine wine has attracted those who take advantage of their victims' relative ignorance of this wine market sector. Such wine fraudsters often profit by charging excessively high prices for off-vintage or lower-status wines from well-known wine regions, while claiming that they are offering a sound investment unaffected by economic cycles. As with any investment, thorough research is essential to making an informed decision.

Production 

* May include official, semi-official or estimated data.

Wine grapes grow almost exclusively between 30 and 50 degrees latitude north and south of the equator. The world's southernmost vineyards are in the Central Otago region of New Zealand's South Island near the 45th parallel south, and the northernmost are in Flen, Sweden, just north of the 59th parallel north.

Exporting countries 

* May include official, semi-official or estimated data.

The UK was the world's largest importer of wine in 2007.

Consumption

Wine-consumption data from a list of countries by alcohol consumption measured in liters of pure ethyl alcohol consumed per capita in a given year, according to the most recent data from the World Health Organization. The methodology includes persons 15 years of age or older. About 40% of individuals above the legal drinking age consider themselves "wine drinkers", which is higher than all other alcoholic beverages combined (34%) and those who do not drink at all (26%).

Culinary uses 

Wine is a popular and important drink that accompanies and enhances a wide range of cuisines, from the simple and traditional stews to the most sophisticated and complex haute cuisines. Wine is often served with dinner. Sweet dessert wines may be served with the dessert course. In fine restaurants in Western countries, wine typically accompanies dinner. At a restaurant, patrons are helped to make good food-wine pairings by the restaurant's sommelier or wine waiter. Individuals dining at home may use wine guides to help make food–wine pairings. Wine is also drunk without the accompaniment of a meal in wine bars or with a selection of cheeses (at a wine and cheese party). Wines are also used as a theme for organizing various events such as festivals around the world; the city of Kuopio in North Savonia, Finland is known for its annual Kuopio Wine Festivals (Kuopion viinijuhlat).

Wine is important in cuisine not just for its value as a drink, but as a flavor agent, primarily in stocks and braising, since its acidity lends balance to rich savory or sweet dishes. Wine sauce is an example of a culinary sauce that uses wine as a primary ingredient. Natural wines may exhibit a broad range of alcohol content, from below 9% to above 16% ABV, with most wines being in the 12.5–14.5% range. Fortified wines (usually with brandy) may contain 20% alcohol or more.

Religious significance

Ancient religions 
The use of wine in ancient Near Eastern and Ancient Egyptian religious ceremonies was common. Libations often included wine, and the religious mysteries of Dionysus used wine as a sacramental entheogen to induce a mind-altering state.

Judaism 

Wine is an integral part of Jewish laws and traditions. The Kiddush is a blessing recited over wine or grape juice to sanctify the Shabbat. On Pesach (Passover) during the Seder, it is a Rabbinic obligation of adults to drink four cups of wine. In the Tabernacle and in the Temple in Jerusalem, the libation of wine was part of the sacrificial service. Note that this does not mean that wine is a symbol of blood, a common misconception that contributes to the Christian beliefs of the blood libel.
"It has been one of history's cruel ironies that the blood libel—accusations against Jews using the blood of murdered gentile children for the making of wine and matzot—became the false pretext for numerous pogroms. And due to the danger, those who live in a place where blood libels occur are halachically exempted from using red wine, lest it be seized as "evidence" against them."

Christianity 

In Christianity, wine is used in a sacred rite called the Eucharist, which originates in the Gospel account of the Last Supper (Gospel of Luke 22:19) describing Jesus sharing bread and wine with his disciples and commanding them to "do this in remembrance of me." Beliefs about the nature of the Eucharist vary among denominations (see Eucharistic theologies contrasted).

While some Christians consider the use of wine from the grape as essential for the validity of the sacrament, many Protestants also allow (or require) pasteurized grape juice as a substitute. Wine was used in Eucharistic rites by all Protestant groups until an alternative arose in the late 19th century. Methodist dentist and prohibitionist Thomas Bramwell Welch applied new pasteurization techniques to stop the natural fermentation process of grape juice. Some Christians who were part of the growing temperance movement pressed for a switch from wine to grape juice, and the substitution spread quickly over much of the United States, as well as to other countries to a lesser degree. There remains an ongoing debate between some American Protestant denominations as to whether wine can and should be used for the Eucharist or allowed as an ordinary drink, with Catholics and some mainline Protestants allowing wine drinking in moderation, and some conservative Protestant groups opposing consumption of alcohol altogether.

The earliest viticulture tradition in the Southwestern United States starts with sacramental wine, beginning in the 1600s, with Christian friars and monks producing New Mexico wine.

Islam 

Alcoholic drinks, including wine, are forbidden under most interpretations of Islamic law. In many Muslim countries, possession or consumption of alcoholic drinks carry legal penalties. Iran had previously had a thriving wine industry that disappeared after the Islamic Revolution in 1979. In Greater Persia, mey (Persian wine) was a central theme of poetry for more than a thousand years, long before the advent of Islam. Some Alevi sects – one of the two main branches of Islam in Turkey (the other being Sunni Islam) – use wine in their religious services.

Certain exceptions to the ban on alcohol apply. Alcohol derived from a source other than the grape (or its byproducts) and the date is allowed in "very small quantities" (loosely defined as a quantity that does not cause intoxication) under the Sunni Hanafi madhab, for specific purposes (such as medicines), where the goal is not intoxication. However, modern Hanafi scholars regard alcohol consumption as totally forbidden.

Health effects

Short-term 

Wine contains ethyl alcohol, the chemical in beer and distilled spirits. The effects of wine depend on the amount consumed, the span of time over which consumption occurs, and the amount of alcohol in the wine, among other factors. Drinking enough to reach a blood alcohol concentration (BAC) of 0.03%-0.12% may cause an overall improvement in mood, increase self-confidence and sociability, decrease anxiety, flushing of the face, and impair judgment and fine motor coordination. A BAC of 0.09% to 0.25% causes lethargy, sedation, balance problems and blurred vision. A BAC from 0.18% to 0.30% causes profound confusion, impaired speech (e.g. slurred speech), staggering, dizziness and vomiting. A BAC from 0.25% to 0.40% causes stupor, unconsciousness, anterograde amnesia, vomiting, and death may occur due to respiratory depression and inhalation of vomit during unconsciousness. A BAC from 0.35% to 0.80% causes coma, life-threatening respiratory depression and possibly fatal alcohol poisoning. The operation of vehicles or machinery while drunk can increase the risk of accident, and many countries have laws against drinking and driving. The social context and quality of wine can affect the mood and emotions.

Long-term 

The main active ingredient of wine is ethanol. A 2016 systematic review and meta-analysis found that moderate ethanol consumption brought no mortality benefit compared with lifetime abstention from ethanol consumption. A systematic analysis of data from the Global Burden of Disease study found that consumption of ethanol increases the risk of cancer and increases the risk of all-cause mortality, and that the most healthful dose of ethanol is zero consumption. Some studies have concluded that drinking small quantities of alcohol (less than one drink daily in women and two drinks daily in men) is associated with a decreased risk of heart disease, stroke, diabetes mellitus, and early death. Ethanol consumption increases the risk of heart disease, high blood pressure, atrial fibrillation, and stroke. Some studies that reported benefits of moderate ethanol consumption erred by lumping former drinkers and life-long abstainers into a single group of nondrinkers, hiding the health benefits of life-long abstention from ethanol. Risk is greater in younger people due to binge drinking which may result in violence or accidents. About 3.3 million deaths (5.9% of all deaths) annually are due to ethanol use.

Alcohol use disorder is the inability to stop or control alcohol use despite harmful consequences to health, job, or relationships; alternative terms include alcoholism, alcohol abuse, alcohol dependence, or alcohol addiction. and alcohol use is the third leading cause of early death in the United States. No professional medical association recommends that people who are nondrinkers should start drinking wine.

Excessive consumption of alcohol can cause liver cirrhosis and alcoholism. The American Heart Association "cautions people NOT to start drinking ... if they do not already drink alcohol. Consult your doctor on the benefits and risks of consuming alcohol in moderation."

Although red wine contains more of the stilbene resveratrol and of other polyphenols than white wine, the evidence for a cardiac health benefit is of poor quality and at most, the benefit is trivial. Grape skins naturally produce resveratrol in response to fungal infection, including exposure to yeast during fermentation. White wine generally contains lower levels of the chemical as it has minimal contact with grape skins during this process.

Forgery and manipulation 

Incidents of fraud, such as mislabeling the origin or quality of wines, have resulted in regulations on labeling. "Wine scandals" that have received media attention include:
 The 1985 diethylene glycol wine scandal, in which diethylene glycol was used as a sweetener in some Austrian wines.
 In 1986, methanol (a toxic type of alcohol) was used to alter certain wines manufactured in Italy.
 In 2008, some Italian wines were found to include sulfuric acid and hydrochloric acid.
 In 2010, some Chinese red wines were found to be adulterated, and as a consequence China's Hebei province shut down nearly 30 wineries.
 In 2018, million bottles of French wine was falsely sold as high quality Côtes-du-Rhône wine

Packaging 

Most wines are sold in glass bottles and sealed with corks (50% of which come from Portugal). An increasing number of wine producers have been using alternative closures such as screwcaps and synthetic plastic "corks". Although alternative closures are less expensive and prevent cork taint, they have been blamed for such problems as excessive reduction.

Some wines are packaged in thick plastic bags within corrugated fiberboard boxes, and are called "box wines", or "cask wine". Tucked inside the package is a tap affixed to the bag in box, or bladder, that is later extended by the consumer for serving the contents. Box wine can stay acceptably fresh for up to a month after opening because the bladder collapses as wine is dispensed, limiting contact with air and, thus, slowing the rate of oxidation. In contrast, bottled wine oxidizes more rapidly after opening because of the increasing ratio of air to wine as the contents are dispensed; it can degrade considerably in a few days. Canned wine is one of the fastest-growing forms of alternative wine packaging on the market.

Environmental considerations of wine packaging reveal the benefits and drawbacks of both bottled and box wines. The glass used to make bottles is a nontoxic, naturally occurring substance that is completely recyclable, whereas the plastics used for box-wine containers are typically much less environmentally friendly. However, wine-bottle manufacturers have been cited for Clean Air Act violations. A New York Times editorial suggested that box wine, being lighter in package weight, has a reduced carbon footprint from its distribution; however, box-wine plastics, even though possibly recyclable, can be more labor-intensive (and therefore expensive) to process than glass bottles. In addition, while a wine box is recyclable, its plastic bladder most likely is not. Some people are drawn to canned wine due to its portability and recyclable packaging.

Some wine is sold in stainless steel kegs and is referred to as wine on tap.

Storage 

Wine cellars, or wine rooms, if they are above-ground, are places designed specifically for the storage and aging of wine. Fine restaurants and some private homes have wine cellars. In an active wine cellar, temperature and humidity are maintained by a climate-control system. Passive wine cellars are not climate-controlled, and so must be carefully located. Because wine is a natural, perishable food product, all types—including red, white, sparkling, and fortified—can spoil when exposed to heat, light, vibration or fluctuations in temperature and humidity. When properly stored, wines can maintain their quality and in some cases improve in aroma, flavor, and complexity as they age.

Wine refrigerators offer a smaller alternative to wine cellars and are available in capacities ranging from small, 16-bottle units to furniture-quality pieces that can contain 500 bottles. Wine refrigerators are not ideal for aging, but rather serve to chill wine to the proper temperature for drinking. These refrigerators keep the humidity low (usually under 50%), below the optimal humidity of 50% to 70%. Lower humidity levels can dry out corks over time, allowing oxygen to enter the bottle, which reduces the wine's quality through oxidation. While some types of alcohol are sometimes stored in the freezer, such as vodka, it is not possible to safely freeze wine in the bottle, as there is insufficient room for it to expand as it freezes and the bottle will usually crack. Certain shapes of bottle may allow the cork to be pushed out by the ice, but if the bottle is frozen on its side, the wine in the narrower neck will invariably freeze first, preventing this.

Professions 
There are a large number of occupations and professions that are part of the wine industry, ranging from the individuals who grow the grapes, prepare the wine, bottle it, sell it, assess it, market it and finally make recommendations to clients and serve the wine.

See also 

 Outline of wine
 Glossary of wine terms
 Classification of wine
 Winemaking
 List of grape varieties
 Health effects of wine
 Storage of wine
 Maceration (wine)
 Pressing (wine)
 Vidal blanc
 Hybrid grape

References

Further reading 

 
 
 
 
 
 
 
 
 
  online review

External links 

 The Guardian & Observer Guide to Wine

 
Alcoholic drinks
Ceremonial food and drink
Cooking
Fermented drinks
Grape